Part of the Banchō area,  is an upscale, mostly residential district of Chiyoda, Tokyo, Japan.  As of June 2020, the population of this district is 971 in 439 households.

Education
The  operates public elementary and junior high schools. Bancho Elementary School (番町小学校) is the zoned elementary of Gobanchō. There is a freedom of choice system for junior high schools in Chiyoda Ward, and so there are no specific junior high school zones.

References

Districts of Chiyoda, Tokyo
Neighborhoods of Tokyo